James Patrick Leamy (January 16, 1892 – July 22, 1949) was a United States district judge of the United States District Court for the District of Vermont.

Education and career
Leamy was born in West Rutland, Vermont on January 16, 1892, the son of James Leamy and Catherine (Clark) Leamy. He was educated in West Rutland and graduated from West Rutland High School. He received an Artium Baccalaureus degree from College of the Holy Cross in 1912, a Master of Arts degree from Boston College in 1913, and a Bachelor of Laws from Harvard Law School in 1915. He was admitted to the bar in 1916 and began a private practice in Rutland, Vermont from 1916 to 1940. He was a United States Commissioner for the United States District Court for the District of Vermont from 1917 to 1931, and a Referee in Bankruptcy for the United States District Court for the District of Vermont from 1931 to 1940.

Political career
Leamy was a Democrat, and served in local offices including school board member. He also served as chairman of the Democratic Party in West Rutland and in Rutland County. His uncle Frank Duffy was Vermont's longtime member of the Democratic National Committee, and Leamy served as Chairman of the Vermont Democratic Party during the period of more than 100 years when Republicans won every election for statewide office in Vermont. Leamy ran unsuccessfully for Vermont Attorney General (1920, 1922), State's Attorney of Rutland County (1924), Governor of Vermont (1932, 1934) and Congressman from Vermont (1938). From 1938 to 1939 he was President of the Vermont Bar Association.

Federal judicial service
On April 12, 1940, Leamy was nominated by President Franklin D. Roosevelt to a seat on the United States District Court for the District of Vermont vacated by Judge Harland Bradley Howe. Leamy was confirmed by the United States Senate on April 30, 1940, and received his commission on May 7, 1940. He served until his death from a heart attack in West Rutland on July 2, 1949. Leamy was buried at Saint Bridgets Cemetery in West Rutland.

Family
In 1927, Leamy married Margaret Lalor (1893–1984) of Rutland. They were the parents of a son, James Jr.

Notes

References

Sources
 
 Vermont Bar Association: Past Presidents , 2014
 Ballotpedia: Vermont gubernatorial elections, 1791-present, 2014
 

1892 births
1949 deaths
College of the Holy Cross alumni
Boston College alumni
Harvard Law School alumni
Vermont lawyers
Vermont Democrats
Judges of the United States District Court for the District of Vermont
United States district court judges appointed by Franklin D. Roosevelt
20th-century American judges
Burials in Vermont